The Smith X-99 Prop-Jet was a six-seat turboprop powered business aircraft designed in the United States in the 1980s.  Only one was built.

Design and development

The Prop-Jet was an attempt to produce a small, propeller driven business aircraft capable of cruising at speeds above 350 mph (560 km/h).  It was powered by a 550 shp (410 kW) Pratt & Whitney Canada PT6 turboprop engine, mounted in  a long nose and driving a four blade, constant speed propeller.  The fuselage was a monocoque constructed from graphite and glass-fibre epoxy sandwich.  The pressurised cabin accommodated pilot and five passengers in three rows of seats, with a baggage space behind.  Access was by port side doors forward and another over the trailing edge on the other side. The tail unit was made from Kevlar/graphite/glass fibre epoxy sandwich. The fin was swept and the tailplane mounted, with anhedral, almost at the top of it. The elevator carried an electrically driven trim tab.

To speed the completion of the first prototype, the Prop-Jet used the wing and undercarriage of a Beechcraft Baron 58P, though a composite structure wing was envisaged for production aircraft.  The Beech wing was a two spar aluminium box structure, without sweep and mounted between mid and low positions with dihedral of 6° and fitted with slotted Fowler flaps. The tricycle undercarriage was enclosed behind doors after retraction.

The Prop-Jet flew for the first time on 29 July 1982.  By 1985 Mike Smith was reported as seeking financial backers but only the one prototype Prop-Jet was built.

Specifications

References

External links
NACA 23012 airfoil

1980s United States business aircraft
Single-engined turboprop aircraft
Single-engined tractor aircraft
Aircraft first flown in 1982